The 1972–73 Bundesliga was the tenth season of the Bundesliga, West Germany's premier football league. It began on 16 September 1972 and ended on 9 June 1973. FC Bayern Munich were the defending champions.

Competition modus
Every team played two games against each other team, one at home and one away. Teams received two points for a win and one point for a draw. If two or more teams were tied on points, places were determined by goal difference and, if still tied, by goals scored. The team with the most points were crowned champions while the two teams with the fewest points were relegated to their respective Regionalliga divisions.

Team changes to 1971–72
Borussia Dortmund were relegated to the Regionalliga after finishing in 17th place. They were accompanied by Arminia Bielefeld, who were demoted by the DFB for playing a key role in the 1971 match fixing scandal (although their playing record would have relegated them anyway). Both teams were replaced by Wuppertaler SV and Kickers Offenbach, who won their respective promotion play-off groups.

Season overview

Team overview

League table

Results

Top goalscorers
36 goals
  Gerd Müller (FC Bayern Munich)

28 goals
  Jupp Heynckes (Borussia Mönchengladbach)

21 goals
  Günter Pröpper (Wuppertaler SV)

19 goals
  Erwin Kostedde (Kickers Offenbach)

18 goals
  Hans Walitza (VfL Bochum)

17 goals
  Uli Hoeneß (FC Bayern Munich)
  Klaus Wunder (MSV Duisburg)

16 goals
  Reiner Geye (Fortuna Düsseldorf)

14 goals
  Klaus Budde (Fortuna Düsseldorf)
  Willi Reimann (Hannover 96)

Champion squad

See also
 1972–73 DFB-Pokal

References

External links
 DFB Bundesliga archive 1972/1973

Bundesliga seasons
1
Germany